Skyview High School is a four-year public secondary school in Nampa, Idaho. Opened in 1996, it is the second of three traditional high schools operated by the Nampa School District #131. Skyview is on a block schedule, with students taking 4 classes on A day and 4 classes on B day.

The building was designed for 1,200 students with a 422 seat theater, and football, soccer, tennis, and softball fields.

In 2013, Skyview became the first school in the United States to use WiFi enabled real-time location system badges for teachers and staff for the purposes of safety.

Academics 
Skyview serves grades 9 - 12.

In 2022-2023, courses are offered in the following fields: Art (performing and visual), Communications, Foreign Languages, English Language Arts, Mathematics, Music, English Language Learning, Music, Health and Wellness, Science, Special Education, and Social Science.

27 courses are listed as either Advanced Placement or Dual Credit.

 Four-year graduation rate: 83.5%.
 Five-year graduation rate: 90.4%.

 English Language Arts/Literacy proficiency rate by students: 48.3% (as measured by Idaho Standards Achievement Test - ISAT).
 Mathematics proficiency rate by students: 27.1% (as measured by Idaho Standards Achievement Test - ISAT).

Activities 
Skyview competes in non-athletic activities as a medium school in IHSAA.

State titles 

 Debate: 2022
 Speech: 2019, 2022

Athletics
Skyview competes in athletics in IHSAA Class 4A and Class 5A, the highest classification in the state, and is a member of the Southern Idaho Conference (5A) (SIC). Rivals are the other two high schools in the district, Nampa and Columbia

State titles

Boys 

 Basketball (3): (4A) 2005, 2006, 2009 (undefeated)
 Soccer (3): fall (4A) 2003, 2014, 2016, (introduced in 2000)
 Track and Field (1): (4A) 2014
 Wrestling (1): (4A) 2005

Girls 
 Basketball (1): (4A) 2014 
 Dance (6) 2013, 2014, 2015, 2016, 2017, 2018
 Golf (1): (4A) 2002 
 Softball (1): (4A) 2012
 Tennis (1): (4A) 2013
 Volleyball (4): fall (4A) 2016, 2017; (5A) 2020, 2021

Student Demographics 
In 2021, Skyview's enrollment was 1,086.

Race or ethnicity 

 Asian: 0.9%
 Black/African American: 0.6%
 Hispanic or Latino: 29.8%
 Native American or Alaskan Native: 0.2%
 Native Hawaiian or Pacific Islander: 0.6%
 Multiracial: 3.4%
 White: 64.5%

Enrollment by Student Groups 

 Students from Low Income Families: 33%
 Students Learning English: 6%
 Students with Disabilities: 11%
 Students in Foster Care: <1%
 Students who are Homeless: 2%
 Students from Migrant Families: 2%
 Students from Military Families: 4%

References

External links

Nampa School District # 131

Nampa, Idaho
Schools in Canyon County, Idaho
Public high schools in Idaho
Educational institutions established in 1996
1996 establishments in Idaho